Ocean Biomedical is an American biopharmaceutical company based in Providence, Rhode Island. It was originally "spun off" from a Brown University bioscience project and was founded by Indian-American scientist Chirinjeev Kathuria and Jack Elias, who was Dean of Biology and Medicine of Brown University's Alpert Medical School at the time.

History
In January 2019, Chirinjeev Kathuria co-founded Ocean Biomedical in Rhode Island, United States. The company was also co-founded by Jack Elias, who was Dean of Medicine at Brown University at the time, but currently works as a senior health advisor at Brown. Ocean Biomedical started off as a Brown University biotech "spin-off." The biopharmaceutical company is currently based in Province, Rhode Island. As of 2021, the CEO of the company is Elizabeth Ng. The company works with scientists and research institutions around the world on the research and development projects for new medicines.

In 2021, Ocean Biomedical announced plans to go public and filed for a $100 million IPO.

Areas
Ocean Biomedical has worked in areas such as non-small cell lung cancer and pulmonary fibrosis.

Vaccines

Ocean Biomedical has worked on developing vaccines for tropical diseases such as malaria, as well as for emerging diseases like COVID-19. In 2020, the company announced the discovery of a malaria vaccine.

Affiliations and partnerships
Ocean Biomedical also has partnered with scientists such as:

Jack Elias (Dean of Biology and Medicine of Brown University's Alpert Medical School)
Jake Kurtis (Chair of Pathology and Laboratory Medicine, Brown University)

Scientific advisors include Roy Herbst, Wafik el-Deiry, Erol Fikrig, and William H. Koster.

References

External links
LinkedIn

Companies based in Providence, Rhode Island
Pharmaceutical companies of the United States
Brown University organizations